Ameet is a male given name. Notable people with this name include:

 Ameet Bhaskar Satam, Indian politician
 Amit  Sharma , Indian born in India Uttar Pradesh Deoria 
 Ameet Chana (born 1975), Indian actor
 Ameet Ghasi (born 1987), English chess player
 Ameet Mehta, Indian politician
 Ameet Pall (born 1987), Canadian football player
 Ameet Sampat (born 1977), Omani cricket player

See also
 Amit